The 1962 Scotch Cup was the fourth edition of what would later be called the Men's World Curling Championships. It was held at the Falkirk Ice Rink in Falkirk and the Haymarket Ice Rink in Edinburgh, Scotland and saw the debutant of Sweden in a World Championship. The first half of the matches were held 15 and 16 March in Falkirk and the second half of matches were held 19 and 20 March in Edinburgh. If a playoff was necessary, it would have been held on 21 March in Edinburgh.

Canada would end up winning the title for the fourth time after winning all of their matches with the United States finishing in second place.

Teams

Standings

Results

Draw 1

Draw 2

Draw 3

Draw 4

Draw 5

Draw 6

References

Youtube promotional video of the event - part 1
 Youtube promotional video of the event - part 2

External links

World Men's Curling Championship
Scotch Cup, 1962
International curling competitions hosted by Scotland
Scotch Cup, 1962
International sports competitions in Edinburgh
Sport in Falkirk
Scotch Cup
1960s in Edinburgh